Carolică Ilieș (born 18 January 1962) is a Romanian rower. He competed in the men's coxless four event at the 1980 Summer Olympics.

References

External links
 

1962 births
Living people
Romanian male rowers
Olympic rowers of Romania
Rowers at the 1980 Summer Olympics
Place of birth missing (living people)